XHPP-FM is an FM radio station in Pánuco, Veracruz. It broadcasts from a transmitter located in Pueblo Viejo and carries Radiorama's @FM pop format.

History
XHPP received its concession on May 31, 1990. It was owned by Promociones Radiofónicas Culturales, S.A., which was controlled by Alfonso Sanabria Mallén, an employee of Radiorama. In 2003, control passed to the current concessionaire.

Between 2015 and 2018, XHPP-FM broadcast from a transmitter in Tampico, Tamaulipas.

References

External links

Spanish-language radio stations
Radio stations in Tampico
Radio stations established in 1990